A feral parrot is a parrot that has adapted to life in an ecosystem to which it is not native. The birds are often descended from pets that have escaped or been deliberately released. Many species of parrots are highly social, and like to gather in large flocks. Not all feral parrots are able to adapt to life outside of captivity, although having a pre-existing nearby parrot colony can assist with the adaptation process.

Feral parrots may affect native biodiversity, human economy and wellness. They are present in many countries, including in North America, South America, Europe, Asia, Australia, Africa, and in the Middle East.

Parrots living in non-native environments

Rainbow lorikeet
Feral colonies of rainbow lorikeets (Trichoglossus haematodus) have been established in Perth, Western Australia and in Auckland, New Zealand.

Eastern rosella
The eastern rosella (Platycercus eximius) has become naturalized in the North Island of New Zealand.

Rose-ringed parakeet
Native to India and Sri Lanka, sizeable populations of naturalized rose-ringed parakeets (Psittacula krameri) exist around the world. They can be found in England, the Netherlands, Belgium and along the river Rhine in Germany. The largest UK roost of these is thought to be in Esher, Surrey, numbering several thousand. Feral rose-ringed parakeets also occur in the United States, South Africa, Egypt (resident, breeding all over Giza territory in June), Israel (with many seasonally present in Yarkon Park in North Tel Aviv), Lebanon, UAE and Oman. There are also several populations in Istanbul, Turkey, both on the European side where they can be seen in Gülhane Park, Yıldız Park and Eyüp, and on the Anatolian side. It can also be found in Japan.

Other
Also found in the United States are various naturalized Brotogeris species, mainly B. versicolurus (canary-winged parakeet) and B. chiriri (yellow-chevroned parakeet). Myiopsitta monachus (Monk parakeet) are found in some coastal areas of the East Coast from Florida to coastal Connecticut, in parts of the lower Great Lakes near Chicago, and in parts of Texas.  A population of naturalized peach-faced lovebirds (Agapornis roseicollis) is found in Phoenix, Arizona.

Several species, including red-lored parrots (Amazona autumnalis), lilac-crowned parrots (Amazona finschi) and yellow-chevroned parakeets (Brotogeris chiriri), have become well established in Southern California, and in San Francisco's Telegraph Hill area there is a population of mainly red-masked or cherry-headed parakeets, a female mitred parakeet (and thus several inter-specific hybrids), as depicted in the documentary The Wild Parrots of Telegraph Hill. In the greater San Francisco Bay Area, there are several populations of red-masked parakeets, including in Palo Alto, Menlo Park, and Sunnyvale.

A breeding population of the blue-and-yellow macaw (Ara ararauna), has been present in east-central Miami-Dade County, Florida since the mid-1980s. They are often sighted in the city of Miami in parks, and are a frequent visitor to University of Miami campus and Fairchild Tropical Botanic Garden in Coral Gables, Florida. 
 
The Belmont Heights District in Long Beach, California, is also known to have many species of feral parrots, which have become local icons to the citizens of the area. They are known for their loud noises as well as their large communities. These parrots can be found roosting mostly on Ocean Boulevard between Livingston Drive and Redondo Avenue in palm trees.

The San Gabriel Valley in California has a large non-indigenous population of naturalized parrots. According to the Parrot Project of Los Angeles, the parrots are of at least five species. Residents have come to enjoy the birds as part of their city's culture, and like other Southern California residents they have become "local icons" to the citizens there. Many theories surround the mystery of how the parrots landed in Pasadena and claimed the area as their home. A widely accepted story is that they were part of the stock that were set free for their survival from the large pet emporium at Simpson's Garden Town on East Colorado Boulevard, which burned down in 1959.

Malibu, California has populations of black hooded or Nanday Parakeet (Nandayus nenday), lilac crowned amazon parrots (Amazona finschi), red-crowned amazon parrots (Amazona viridigenalis), and mitred parakeets (Aratinga mitrata).

The orange-winged amazon (Amazona amazonica) has been introduced to Tenerife in the Canary Islands, where it has been observed successfully hybridizing with a feral scaly-headed parrot (Pionus maximiliani) and also attempting to breed with feral monk parakeet (Myiopsitta monachus) and rose-ringed parakeet (Psittacula krameri), even involving itself in the former species' unusual nest-building behaviour.

Lists of feral parrot species by continent

North America

Budgerigar
Peach-faced lovebird
Blue-and-yellow macaw
Chestnut-fronted macaw
Mitred parakeet
Blue-crowned parakeet
Yellow-chevroned parakeet
Red-masked parakeet
Hybrid mitred parakeet
Nanday parakeet
Rose-ringed parakeet
Monk parakeet
Canary-winged parakeet
Spectacled amazon
Red-lored amazon
Blue-fronted amazon
Lilac-crowned amazon
Yellow-headed amazon
Hybrid yellow-headed amazon
Hybrid red-crowned amazon
Red-crowned amazon

South America
Note: Species found as introduced to the State of Rio de Janeiro, outside their historical ranges; further research can detect other species in other regions.
Jenday conure
Monk parakeet
Blue-fronted amazon

Europe
Alexandrine parakeet
Fischer's lovebird
Monk parakeet
Orange-winged amazon
Rose-ringed parakeet
Scaly-headed parrot
Yellow-headed amazon

Africa
Rose-ringed parakeet

Middle East
Rose-ringed parakeet

Oceania

New Zealand
Rainbow lorikeet
Eastern rosella
Crimson rosella
Sulphur-crested cockatoo
Galah

Asia
Sulphur-crested cockatoo
Yellow-crested cockatoo

Causes 
Feral parrot flocks can be formed after mass escapes of newly imported, wild-caught parrots from airports or quarantine facilities. Large groups of escapees have the protection of a flock and possess the skills to survive and breed in the wild. Some feral parakeets may have descended from escaped zoo birds.

Escaped or released pets rarely contribute to establishing feral populations. Escapes typically involve only one or a few birds at a time, so the birds do not have the protection of a flock and often do not have a mate. Most captive-born birds do not possess the necessary survival skills to find food or avoid predators and often do not survive long without human caretakers. However, in areas where there are existing feral parrot populations, escaped pets may sometimes successfully join these flocks.

The most common era or years that feral parrots were released to non-native environments was from the 1890s to the 1940s, during the wild-caught parrot era.

In the psittacosis "parrot fever" panic of 1930, "One city health commissioner urged everyone who owned a parrot to wring its neck. People abandoned their pet parrots on the streets."

See also
Feral parakeets in Great Britain
The Wild Parrots of Telegraph Hill

References

External links
The California Parrot Project
BrooklynParrots.com – a website that chronicles wild monk parrots in Brooklyn
Project Parakeet – investigating the invasive ecology of the rose-ringed parakeet in the UK
CaliforniaFlocks.org – Documenting, tracking, photographing, filming naturalized parrot flocks throughout California

Psittaciformes